The University of Colombo currently has seven faculties with 41 academic departments and two interdependent schools with five academic departments. All faculties and schools carries out courses of study and research in both graduate and undergraduate studies. In addition, the university has several institutions that specialize in different areas of research.

Faculties & Schools

Faculty of Arts
In terms of student population the Faculty of Arts is the largest faculty in of the University of Colombo. Made up of eight academic departments and several teaching units, it undertakes studies and research in areas of humanities and social sciences. The origins of the faculty dates back to 1921, with the establishment of the Ceylon University College, as courses in arts subjects where the first to be started. Upgraded to a faculty in 1942 with the establishment of the University of Ceylon that year, it was moved completely to Peradeniya in the early 1950s. In 1963, a new arts faculty was established in Colombo as part of the University of Ceylon, Colombo campus which continues to function as the current faculty.

 Departments of the Faculty of Arts
   
Department of Demography
Department of Economics
Department of English
Department of English Language Teaching 
Department of Geography
Department of History and International Relations
Department of Journalism
Department of Sinhala
Department of Sociology
Department of Political Science and Public Policy

Faculty of Education
The Faculty of Education was established in 1973, followed by the merger of Departments of Education of the Peradeniya, Vidyalankara and Vidyodaya that had been brought back to Colombo in 1975. However it traces it roots to 1949 when the Department of Education was founded in Colombo before it move to Peradeniya. It has become the primary center of  undergraduate and postgraduate studies and research in education.

 Departments of the Faculty of Education
 
Department of Humanities Education
Department of Educational Psychology
Department of Social Science Education
Department of Science and Technology Education

Faculty of Graduate Studies
The Faculty of Graduate Studies (FGS) is a graduate school it conducts post-graduate degree programs in many fields, via on campus lectures and distance learning. It has the largest number of distance learning course offered via e-learning and m-learning with a student base in both Sri Lanka and the Maldives. It was established by the Faculty of Graduate Studies Ordinance No. 03 of 1987.

Faculty of Management and Finance
The Faculty of Management and Finance traces it roots to the establishment of the Department of Commerce and Management Studies which was later upgraded to a faculty made up of six academic departments.  Studies into accounting, business economics, finance, human resource management, management, organization studies and marketing. Its Postgraduate & Mid-career Development Unit which conducts the highly recognized MBA program of the Colombo University.

 Departments of the Faculty of Management and Finance

Department of Accounting
Department of Business Economics
Department of Finance
Department of Human Resource Management
Department of Management Studies
Department of Marketing

Faculty of Medicine

The Faculty of Medicine is the oldest faculty of the university and oldest medical school in Sri Lanka. Established in 1870 as the Colombo Medical School later renamed as the Colombo Medical College, it was integrated as a faculty of the University of Ceylon at its formation in 1942. The Faculty has close links with several hospitals for teaching, training, clinical services and research. These include;
The National Hospital of Sri Lanka (Colombo General Hospital)
De Soysa Maternity Hospital
Castle Street Maternity Hospital
Lady Ridgeway Hospital for Children

 Departments of the Faculty of Medicine

Department of Anatomy
Department of Biochemistry and Molecular Biology
Department of Clinical Medicine
Department of Community Medicine
Department of Forensic Medicine and Toxicology
Department of Microbiology
Department of Obstetrics and Gynaecology
Department of Paediatrics
Department of Parasitology
Department of Pathology
Department of Pharmacology
Department of Physiology
Department of Physiotherapy 
Department of Psychological Medicine
Department of Surgery

Faculty of Law
The Faculty of Law (නීති පීඨය Nithi Pit-haya)(சட்ட பீடம் "Satta peedam"), was founded at the Department of Law in Colombo in 1947 within the University of Ceylon and was moved to Peradeniya as part of the Faculty of Arts. However the department was later shifted to the Colombo Campus of the University of Ceylon upgrade to a Faculty of Law in 1968. The faculty maintains close links with the Sri Lanka Law College, which conducts the law exams need for admittance as an Attorney at Law. Being the first Law Faculty in the country, and the oldest Faculty of Law in the entire University system of the country it conducts both undergraduate and post-graduate degree programs in the field law.

Notable alumni
Hon. Ranil Wickremasinghe, MP - Current Prime Minister of Sri Lanka & former Leader of the Opposition
Hon. Felix R. Dias Bandaranaike - former Cabinet Minister of Finance, Public Administration, Local Government, Home Affairs, Justice & Member of Parliament 
Hon. Sri Lankabhimanya Hon. Lakshman Kadirgamar - Distinguished diplomat, politician  and lawyer
Hon. Professor G. L. Peiris  - Current Cabinet Minister of External Affairs and former  Vice Chancellor of the University of Colombo
Vidya Jyothi Professor T. Nadaraja - Chancellor of the University of Jaffna and the Dean of the Faculty of Law, University of Ceylon
Hon. Dr. Neelan Thiruchelvam - former Member of Parliament
Hon. Justice Saleem Marsoof, PC - former Chief Justice of Sri Lanka  
Hon. Justice Suppiah Sharvananda - former Chief Justice of Sri Lanka  
Hon. Justice Mark Fernando - former Judge of the Supreme Court of Sri Lanka
Professor Savitri Goonesekere - former Vice Chancellor of the University of Colombo
Kumar Sangakkara - Captain of the Sri Lankan national cricket team
H.L. de Silva, PC - Ambassador / Permanent Representative to United Nations (New York)
Professor Suri Ratnapala, Professor of Law, University of Queensland, Australia 
Hon. Chief Justice Shirani Bandaranayake The 43rd Chief Justice of Sri Lanka and the first female Chief Justice in Sri Lanka
Palitha Fernando Solicitor General Sri Lanka
Palitha Kohona, - Ambassador / Permanent Representative to United Nations (New York)

Faculty of Science

The Faculty of Science was established in 1942 with the founding the University of Ceylon. Part of the faculty was moved to Peradeniya, with other department remaining in Colombo. The faculty carries out research and studies chemistry, mathematics, nuclear science, physics, plant sciences, statistics and zoology. The oldest Faculty of Science in the country, it conducts both undergraduate and post-graduate degree programs in many fields of science.

Established in 1942 with the founding the University of Ceylon, as such it is one of the two oldest faculties in the island. At its formation its nucleus was formed from staff from the Science Section of the Ceylon Technical College. Part of the faculty was moved to Peradeniya, with other department remaining in Colombo. The faculty carries out research and studies Chemistry, Mathematics, Nuclear science, Physics, Plant Sciences, Statistics and Zoology.

 Departments of the Faculty of Science

Department of Chemistry
Department of Mathematics
Department of Physics
Centre for Instrument Development
Department of Plant Science
Department of Statistics
Department of Zoology
Department of  Nuclear Science

Notable alumni 
 Professor Stanley Wijesundera - former Vice Chancellor of the University of Colombo
Vidya Jyothi Professor V. K. Samaranayake - former Dean of the Faculty of Science, University of Colombo and Founder of University of Colombo School of Computing
 Professor Nalin de Silva - Professor in the Department of Mathematics at the University of Kelaniya 
 Professor Gihan Wikramanayake - Director of the University of Colombo School of Computing (UCSC)
Dr Sarath Gunapala, Scientist at NASA's Jet Propulsion Laboratory

Sri Palee Campus
The Sri Palee Campus of the University of Colombo is located in Wewala, Horana. Established in 1996 it conducts courses in the field of performing arts and mass media. It was established by a notification of the Sri Lanka government gazette (Extraordinary ) No 928/1 dated June 20, 1996. The campus is located in buildings and land donated to the University of Sri Lanka by the Sri Palee Trust in memory of Hon Wilmot A. Perera. The Sri Palee Trust was established by Wilmot A. Perera with his personal lands. The campus is due to expand into two faculties with five academic departments.

 Departments of the Sri Palee Campus

Department of Performing Arts
Department of Mass Media

University of Colombo School of Computing

The University of Colombo School of Computing (UCSC) is a higher educational affiliate institute providing undergraduate and postgraduate education in Computer Science, Information Systems, and Information and Communication Technology. The UCSC was formed on 1 September 2002 with the argumentation of the Department of Computer Science of the Faculty of Science of the University of Colombo and the Institute of Computer Technology by Professor V. K. Samaranayake.

 Departments of the School of Computing

Department of Computation and Intelligent Systems
Department of Communication and Media Technologies
Department of Information Systems Engineering

Education centres include: the Advanced Digital Media Technology Centre, Computer Services Centre, Digital Forensic Centre, e-Learning Centre, External Degrees Centre, and the Professional Development Centre.

Affiliated institutes

Postgraduate Institute of Medicine
The Postgraduate Institute of Medicine (PGIM) is the only graduate school in the country that provides specialist training of medical doctors. It was established in 1976 as the Institute of Postgraduate Medicine under the University of Ceylon Act No.1 of 1976 with Professor K. N. Seneviratne its first director, it was reorganized and given its current name under the Postgraduate Institute of Medicine Act No.1 of 1980.

National Institute of Library & Information Sciences
The National Institute of Library & Information Sciences (NILIS) is a graduate school that focus on the study and research of  library science, information management, and allied fields. It was established in 1999 by an ordinance under section 18 and 24 of the Universities Act No. 16 of 1978 as an institution affiliated to the University of Colombo.

Institute of Biochemistry, Molecular Biology and Biotechnology
The Institute of Biochemistry, Molecular Biology and Biotechnology (IBMBB) is the Sri Lankan node for the European Molecular Biology Network. It is also designated as a resource centre for molecular life sciences by the international program in chemical sciences, University of Uppsala.

Institute of Indigenous Medicine
The Institute of Indigenous Medicine specialize in the study of the form of ayurvedic medicine, which has been practiced in the island for over two thousand years. It is located in Nawala a suburb of Colombo.

Institute of Human Resource Advancement
The Institute of Human Resource Advancement, formerly the Institute of Workers Education provide access to education and lifelong learning for adults. It conducts studies in many areas that is part of adult education.

Institute of Agro Technology and Rural Science
The Institute of Agro Technology and Rural Science is an affiliated institute of for the UoC, located in Hambantota in the Southern Province of the country.

Former Institutes & entities 
 Institute of Computer Technology (ICT) (now functioning as the School of Computing)
 Institute of Workers Education (now Institute of Human Resource Advancement)
 Department of Architecture (now Faculty of Architecture, University of Moratuwa)

References

External links 
Official Website of the University of Colombo
University Grants Commission of Sri Lanka
Official faculty websites
Faculty of Arts
Faculty of Education
Faculty of Graduate Studies
Faculty of Management and Finance
Faculty of Medicine
Faculty of Law
Faculty of Science
Sri Palee Campus
Official Institute websites
Postgraduate Institute of Medicine
National Institute of Library & Information Science
Institute of Biochemistry, Molecular Biology and Biotechnology
Institute of Indigenous Medicine
Institute of Human Resource Advancement
Institute of Agro Technology and Rural Science